

Bathydemersal species
Red Sea bathydemersal species include:
Acropoma japonicum , Glowbelly, Acropomatidae 
Ariosoma mauritianum , Blunt-tooth conger, Congridae 
Arnoglossus marisrubri ,  Bothidae 
Bembrops caudimacula ,  Percophidae 
Champsodon omanensis ,  Champsodontidae 
Cynoglossus acutirostris , Sharpnose tonguesole, Cynoglossidae 
Dysomma fuscoventralis ,  Synaphobranchidae 
Facciolella karreri ,  Nettastomatidae 
Grammonus robustus ,  Bythitidae 
Harpadon erythraeus ,  Synodontidae 
Heptranchias perlo , Sharpnose sevengill shark, Hexanchidae 
Hippocampus kelloggi , Great seahorse, Syngnathidae 
Iago omanensis , Bigeye houndshark, Triakidae 
Mustelus manazo , Starspotted smooth-hound, Triakidae 
Neobythites stefanovi ,  Ophidiidae 
Neocentropogon mesedai ,  Tetrarogidae 
Neomerinthe bathyperimensis ,  Scorpaenidae 
Obliquogobius turkayi ,  Gobiidae 
Parascolopsis baranesi ,  Nemipteridae 
Physiculus marisrubri ,  Moridae 
Priolepis goldshmidtae ,  Gobiidae 
Rhynchoconger trewavasae ,  Congridae 
Saurenchelys meteori ,  Nettastomatidae 
Setarches guentheri , Deepwater scorpionfish, Setarchidae 
Synagrops philippinensis ,  Acropomatidae 
Trichiurus auriga , Pearly hairtail, Trichiuridae 
Upeneus davidaromi ,  Mullidae 
Uranoscopus marisrubri ,  Uranoscopidae 
Uroconger erythraeus ,  Congridae

Bathypelagic species
Red Sea bathypelagic species include:
Astronesthes martensii ,  Stomiidae 
Atrobucca geniae ,  Sciaenidae 
Benthosema pterotum , Skinnycheek lanternfish, Myctophidae 
Champsodon capensis , Gaper, Champsodontidae 
Chauliodus sloani , Sloane's viperfish, Stomiidae 
Diaphus coeruleus , Blue lantern fish, Myctophidae 
Lestrolepis luetkeni , Naked barracuda, Paralepididae 
Maurolicus mucronatus ,  Sternoptychidae 
Nemichthys scolopaceus , Slender snipe eel, Nemichthyidae 
Stomias affinis , Gnther's boafish, Stomiidae

Benthopelagic species

Red Sea benthopelagic species include:
Aetobatus flagellum , Longheaded eagle ray, Myliobatidae 
Aetobatus ocellatus ,  Myliobatidae 
Anoxypristis cuspidata , Knifetooth sawfish, Pristidae 
Apogon queketti , Spotfin cardinal, Apogonidae 
Argyrosomus regius , Meagre, Sciaenidae 
Ariomma brevimanus ,  Ariommatidae 
Ateleopus natalensis ,  Ateleopodidae 
Bryx analicarens , Pink pipefish, Syngnathidae 
Canthidermis macrolepis , Large-scale triggerfish, Balistidae 
Chanos chanos , Milkfish, Chanidae 
Decapterus russelli , Indian scad, Carangidae 
Gerres methueni , Striped silver biddy, Gerreidae 
Glossogobius giuris , Tank goby, Gobiidae 
Hoplostethus mediterraneus mediterraneus , Mediterranean slimehead, Trachichthyidae 
Lobotes surinamensis , Atlantic tripletail, Lobotidae 
Megalops cyprinoides , Indo-Pacific tarpon, Megalopidae 
Mugil cephalus, Flathead mullet, Mugilidae 
Physiculus sudanensis ,  Moridae 
Pomadasys striatus , Striped grunter, Haemulidae 
Pristipomoides filamentosus , Crimson jobfish, Lutjanidae 
Pristipomoides sieboldii , Lavender jobfish, Lutjanidae 
Rhinobatos halavi , Halavi's guitarfish, Rhinobatidae 
Rhinobatos punctifer , Spotted guitarfish, Rhinobatidae 
Rhinobatos thouin , Clubnose guitarfish, Rhinobatidae 
Rhizoprionodon acutus , Milk shark, Carcharhinidae 
Seriola lalandi , Yellowtail amberjack, Carangidae 
Stalix histrio ,  Opistognathidae 
Stromateus fiatola , Blue butterfish, Stromateidae 
Synodus randalli ,  Synodontidae 
Taractichthys steindachneri , Sickle pomfret, Bramidae 
Tentoriceps cristatus , Crested hairtail, Trichiuridae 
Terapon puta , Small-scaled terapon, Terapontidae 
Thyrsitoides marleyi , Black snoek, Gempylidae 
Trichiurus lepturus, Largehead hairtail, Trichiuridae

References
Fishbase

red
'red
'fish, deepwater